Aigle-à-Tête-Blanche Ecological Reserve is an ecological reserve of Quebec, Canada. It was established on May 12, 1993.

External links
 Official website from Government of Québec

References

Nature reserves in Outaouais
Protected areas established in 1993
1993 establishments in Quebec